The Silver Spoon is a 1933 British comedy crime film directed by George King and starring Ian Hunter, Garry Marsh and Cecil Parker. It was produced and distributed as a quota quickie by Warner Brothers and was shot at the company's Teddington Studios in London. The Silver Spoon is classed by the British Film Institute as a lost film.

Synopsis
The screenplay concerns a homeless who man admits to a murder he did not commit in order to protect a woman.

Cast
 Ian Hunter as  Captain Watts-Winyard
 Garry Marsh as Hon. Roland Stone
 Binnie Barnes as Lady Perivale
 Cecil Parker as Trevor
 Cecil Humphreys as Lord Perivale
 Joan Playfair as Denise
 O. B. Clarence as Parker
 George Merritt as Inspector Innes

References

Bibliography
 Chibnall, Steve. Quota Quickies: The Birth of the British 'B' Film. British Film Institute, 2007.
 Low, Rachael. Filmmaking in 1930s Britain. George Allen & Unwin, 1985.
 Wood, Linda. British Films, 1927-1939. British Film Institute, 1986.

External links

1933 films
Films directed by George King
Lost British films
British crime comedy films
British black-and-white films
1930s crime comedy films
1933 comedy films
1930s English-language films
1930s British films
Films shot at Teddington Studios
Warner Bros. films
Quota quickies